Erina is a suburb located in the Central Coast region of New South Wales, Australia between Gosford and the Pacific Ocean at Terrigal. It is part of the  local government area.

Erina is the commercial hub of the Central Coast. There are many other major commercial businesses located throughout the suburb predominantly on The Entrance Road, Karalta Road and Barralong Road.

The suburb is home to the Erina Eagles rugby league team, who play in the Central Coast Premiership.

The 2017 Pacific-Asia Curling Championships were held at the Erina Ice Arena, which is situated in Erina Fair

History 

The name Erina means "a place where the initiation ceremony was held". Erina was originally inhabited by the Garingai Aboriginal tribe. In 1888, the Erina was subdivided and the streets were planned.

Commercial areas 
The commercial areas of Erina are situated along Terrigal Drive, Barralong Road, Karalta Road and the Central Coast Highway. Erina Fair is a large single storey shopping centre located on Terrigal Drive in the centre of the suburb. There are also a few small shopping centres located on Karalta Road including Fountain Plaza, Elizabeth Court and Karalta Plaza.

Population
In the 2016 Census, there were 4,774 people in Erina. 69.9% of people were born in Australia. The next most common country of birth was England at 8.1%. 85.0% of people spoke only English at home. The most common responses for religion were Catholic 24.3%, Anglican 22.5% and No Religion 21.5%.

Education
Schools in the local area include:
 Erina High School is a comprehensive high school that was established in 1964.
 Woodport Public School (Formerly known as Erina West Primary School)
 Central Coast Adventist School

Churches
Churches in Erina include EV Church and Coastlife Church. The Chinese Baptist Evelyn Tong Memorial Church was completed in late 2017.

See also
List of Central Coast suburbs

References

Suburbs of the Central Coast (New South Wales)